Bharatiya Janata Party, or simply, BJP is an affiliate of the Bharatiya Janata Party for the state of Chhattisgarh. Its head office is situated at the Kushabhau Thakre Parisar Boriyakala, Raipur. Narayan Chandel & Arun Sao were appointed as the Leader of Opposition & State President of the Chhattisgarh unit respectively on 9 August 2022.

Electoral history

Legislative Assembly election

Lok Sabha election

Leadership

Chief Minister

Leader of the Opposition

President

See also
 Bharatiya Janata Party, Gujarat
 Bharatiya Janata Party, Uttar Pradesh
 Bharatiya Janata Party, Madhya Pradesh
 State units of the Bharatiya Janata Party

References 

Chhattisgarh